Emily Margaret Watson  (born 14 January 1967) is an English actress. She began her career on stage and joined the Royal Shakespeare Company in 1992. In 2002, she starred in productions of Twelfth Night and Uncle Vanya at the Donmar Warehouse, and was nominated for the 2003 Olivier Award for Best Actress for the latter. She was nominated for the Academy Award for Best Actress for her debut film role as Bess McNeil in Lars von Trier's Breaking the Waves (1996) and for her role as Jacqueline du Pré in Hilary and Jackie (1998), winning the British Independent Film Award for Best Actress for the latter. For her role as Margaret Humphreys in Oranges and Sunshine (2010), she was also nominated for the AACTA Award for Best Actress in a Leading Role.

Watson's other films include The Boxer (1997), Angela's Ashes (1999), Gosford Park (2001), Punch-Drunk Love (2002), Red Dragon (2002), Equilibrium 
(2002), The Life and Death of Peter Sellers (2004), Corpse Bride (2005), Miss Potter (2006), Synecdoche, New York (2008), War Horse (2011), The Theory of Everything (2014), Kingsman: The Golden Circle (2017), The Happy Prince (2018) and God's Creatures (2022). For her role in the HBO miniseries Chernobyl, she was nominated for a Primetime Emmy Award and a Golden Globe Award. She won the British Academy Television Award for Best Actress for playing Janet Leach in the 2011 ITV television biopic Appropriate Adult and was nominated for the International Emmy Award for Best Actress for the 2017 BBC miniseries Apple Tree Yard.

Early life
Watson was born 14 January 1967 in London. Her father, Richard Watson, was an architect, and her mother, Katharine (née Venables), was an English teacher at St David's Girls' School, West London. She was brought up as an Anglican. She has described her childhood-self as 'a nice middle-class English girl ... I'd love to say I was a rebellious teenager, but I wasn't.' She is a childhood friend of actress and writer Clara Salaman, and starred in the screen adaptation of Salaman's novel Too Close.

Watson was educated at St James Independent Schools in west London which were founded by the School of Economic Science. Whilst there, she witnessed "incidents of extreme cruelty" that were "very scarring for people going forward in their lives". She attended the University of Bristol, where she obtained a BA (1988, English). She later received an MA (2003, honorary) from Bristol University. Watson later trained at Drama Studio London.

Watson was a member of the School of Economic Science until 1996, when aged 29 she was expelled following her part in Breaking the Waves. She describes the organisation as a "very repressive regime" and a "system where you were supposed to think a certain way and you weren’t really allowed to think any other way". Breaking out of it, she says, was a "very powerful release" in her life.

 Theatrical career 
Watson's career began on the stage. Her theatre credits include The Children's Hour (at the Royal National Theatre), Three Sisters, Much Ado About Nothing and The Lady from the Sea. Watson has also worked with the Royal Shakespeare Company in A Jovial Crew, The Taming of the Shrew, All's Well That Ends Well and The Changeling.

In 2002, she took time off from cinema to play two roles in Sam Mendes' repertory productions of Uncle Vanya and Twelfth Night, first at Mendes' Donmar Warehouse in London and later at the Brooklyn Academy of Music. Her performance was widely acclaimed on both sides of the Atlantic and she was nominated for an Olivier Award nomination for Uncle Vanya.

 Film career 
 Film debut 
Watson was virtually unknown until director Lars von Trier chose her to star in Breaking the Waves (1996) after Helena Bonham Carter dropped out. Watson's performance as Bess McNeill won her the Los Angeles, London and New York Critics' Circle Awards for Best Actress, as well as the US National Society of Film Critics' Award for Best Actress and nominations at the Academy Awards, the British Academy Film Awards, and the Golden Globe Awards.

 Subsequent career 

Watson came to public notice again in another controversial role, that of cellist Jacqueline du Pré in Hilary and Jackie, for which she learned to play the cello in three months, and received another Oscar nomination. She also played a leading role in Cradle Will Rock, a story of a theatre show in the 1930s, directed by Tim Robbins. Though she won the title role of Frank McCourt's mother in the adaptation of his acclaimed memoir, Angela's Ashes, the film underperformed. In 2001, she appeared with John Turturro in The Luzhin Defence and in Robert Altman's ensemble piece Gosford Park. 

The following year, she starred as Reba McClane in the adaptation of Thomas Harris's The Silence of the Lambs prequel, Red Dragon, as the romantic interest of Adam Sandler in Paul Thomas Anderson's Punch-Drunk Love and in the sci-fi action thriller Equilibrium with Christian Bale.

In 2004, Watson received a Golden Globe nomination for her performance as Peter Sellers's first wife, Anne Howe, in the HBO film The Life and Death of Peter Sellers. 2005 saw Watson star in four films: Wah-Wah, Richard E. Grant's autobiographical directorial debut; Separate Lies, directed by Gosford Park writer Julian Fellowes; Tim Burton's animated film Corpse Bride, with Johnny Depp and Helena Bonham Carter; and John Hillcoat's Australian-set "western", The Proposition.

In 2006, Watson took a supporting role in Miss Potter, a biographical drama about children's author Beatrix Potter, from Babe director Chris Noonan, with Ewan McGregor and Renée Zellweger; and also in an adaptation of Thea Beckman's children's novel Crusade in Jeans. In 2007, she appeared in The Water Horse: Legend of the Deep, an adaptation of the Dick King-Smith children's novel about the origin of the Loch Ness Monster.

In 2008, Watson starred with Julia Roberts and Carrie-Anne Moss in Fireflies in the Garden, the Lifetime Television movie The Memory Keeper's Daughter (based on the novel with the same name), and in screenwriter Charlie Kaufman's directorial debut, Synecdoche, New York. In 2009 she appeared in the film Cold Souls, from first-time director Sophie Barthes, and Within the Whirlwind, a biographical film of Russian poet and Gulag survivor Evgenia Ginzburg from The Luzhin Defence director Marleen Gorris. Watson considers Ginzburg her best recent role; however, the film was not picked up for distribution.

In 2010, she starred in Oranges and Sunshine, a film recounting the true story of children sent into abusive care homes in Australia, directed by Jim Loach, and also the following year (2011) in War Horse, an adaptation of Michael Morpurgo's prizewinning novel, directed by Steven Spielberg. In 2011, she played Janet Leach in the ITV two-part film Appropriate Adult, about serial killer Fred West, for which she won a BAFTA.

In 2014, Watson had supporting roles in The Book Thief, alongside Geoffrey Rush and Sophie Nélisse, and the Oscar-nominated film The Theory of Everything, portraying Jane Wilde, Hawking's mother in law, alongside Eddie Redmayne and Felicity Jones. In 2015, she had supporting roles in Testament of Youth, alongside Alicia Vikander and Kit Harington, Eduardo Verástegui's Little Boy and A Royal Night Out, in which she portrayed Queen Elizabeth The Queen Mother. She also received rave reviews for her portrayal of Julie Nicholson in the BBC Drama A Song for Jenny, with experts tipping her to win the British Academy Television Award for Best Actress.

In 2019 she appeared as a nuclear scientist — a composite of several real scientists — in the miniseries Chernobyl.

Watson was appointed Officer of the Order of the British Empire (OBE) in the 2015 New Year Honours for services to drama.2015 New Year Honours List  In 2017, she starred in the BBC mini-series Apple Tree Yard.

 Scriptwriting 

In 2007, Mood Indigo, a script written by Watson and her husband, was optioned by Capitol Films. The film is a love story set during the Second World War and concerns a young woman who falls in love with a pilot.

 Missed roles 

Director Jean-Pierre Jeunet wrote the character Amélie for Watson to play (Amélie was originally named Emily) but she eventually turned the role down due to difficulties speaking French and a desire not to be away from home. The role made a star of Audrey Tautou. She was also the first choice to play Elizabeth I in Shekhar Kapur's film Elizabeth, the role that won Cate Blanchett an Academy Award nomination.

She is frequently confused with Emma Watson, the actress who plays Hermione Granger in the Harry Potter film series due to the similarity of their names. She has stated that she does not correct anyone who makes that mistake, as she is "quite flattered that people think I'm 21".

 Charity 
Watson is a supporter of the children's charity the NSPCC. In 2004, she was inducted into the society's hall of fame for spearheading the successful campaign to appoint a Children's Commissioner for England. Receiving her award in the crowded House of Commons, she spoke out against the possibility that the Children's Commissioner become a figurehead with little real power. She is also one of the patrons of the London children's charity Scene & Heard. In April 2018, Watson presented Maternity Worldwide as her chosen charity on the BBC Radio 4 Appeal.

 Personal life 
Watson married Jack Waters, whom she had met at the Royal Shakespeare Company in 1995. They have a daughter born in 2005, and a son in 2009. They live in Greenwich, London.

Her mother fell ill with encephalitis shortly before filming commenced on Oranges and Sunshine. Watson returned to London but arrived just after her death.

 Filmography 
 Film 

Television

 Theatre 

 School for Mothers and The Mistake (double-bill of one-act plays), White Bear Theatre, London, 1991
 All's Well That Ends Well (Royal Shakespeare Company, Swan Theatre, Stratford-upon-Avon 1992, later Pit Theatre, London, 1993) as Marianna
 The Taming of the Shrew (Royal Shakespeare Company, Barbican Theatre, London, 1993) as Mrs. Ruth Banks-Ellis
 The Changeling (Royal Shakespeare Company, Pit Theatre, 1993)
 A Jovial Crew (Royal Shakespeare Company, Pit Theatre, 1993) as Amie
 The Lady from the Sea (Lyric Hammersmith Theatre, London, 1994) as Hilde Wangel
 The Children's Hour (Lyttelton Theatre, London, 1994) as Mary Tilford
 Three Sisters (Out of Joint, 1995)
 Othello (1996, theatre)
 Twelfth Night / Uncle Vanya (Donmar Warehouse, 2002 / BAM, 2003)

 Radio 
 The Wolves of Willoughby Chase (1994, radio)
 Wuthering Heights (1995, radio series)
 The Glass Piano'' (2010, radio drama about Princess Alexandra of Bavaria)

Awards and nominations

References

External links 
 
 
 Premiere Magazine: Emily Watson Q&A and podcast
 Emily Watson at the Edinburgh Festival
 Emily Watson at Film Bug

1967 births
Living people
Alumni of the University of Bristol
English film actresses
English television actresses
English stage actresses
English radio actresses
European Film Award for Best Actress winners
Outstanding Performance by a Cast in a Motion Picture Screen Actors Guild Award winners
English Shakespearean actresses
Royal Shakespeare Company members
People from Islington (district)
People educated at Notting Hill & Ealing High School
People educated at St James Independent Schools
Alumni of the Drama Studio London
Officers of the Order of the British Empire
21st-century English actresses
20th-century English actresses
Actresses from London
Best Actress Bodil Award winners
Best Actress BAFTA Award (television) winners
National Society for the Prevention of Cruelty to Children people
Best Actress Robert Award winners